State Highway 142, abbreviated SH-142, is a  highway in southern Oklahoma. It serves as a short truck route and bypass around the northern and eastern sections of Ardmore.

Route description

SH-142 in Ardmore is locally designated as Veterans Boulevard. The highway's western terminus is at I-35 (milemarker 33) in Ardmore.  Beginning as a divided highway, it intersects US-77 (locally designated as Commerce) approximately 1 mile (1.6 kilometers) to the east.  From there, SH-142 progresses as a two-lane highway approximately 2 miles (3.2 kilometers), passes by Ardmore Middle and High Schools, makes a fairly sharp right turn to the south (near the Valero refinery), and terminates 1 mile (1.6 kilometers) to the south at an intersection with State Highway 199. The roadway (but not the SH-142 designation) continues south as P Street Northeast just to the east of greater Ardmore.

History
SH-142 was originally designated as a state highway in 1958 between US-77 on Ardmore's north side and the former US-70 on the east side of the city which is the current SH-199. In 1969 when I-35 was completed along the west side of Ardmore, SH-142 was extended a mile further west from US-77 to an interchange with the interstate route.

Junction list

References

External links
SH-142 at OKHighways.com

142
Transportation in Carter County, Oklahoma